The Spoils Before Dying is an American comedy miniseries written by Matt Piedmont and Andrew Steele, and directed by Piedmont. It stars Will Ferrell, Michael Kenneth Williams and Kristen Wiig.  The miniseries premiered on July 8, 2015, on the American cable channel IFC. A follow-up to the miniseries The Spoils of Babylon, The Spoils Before Dying follows a 1950s jazz pianist-turned-private eye who becomes embroiled in a murder investigation.

Cast

 Will Ferrell as Eric Jonrosh (the author of The Spoils Before Dying) who portrays J. Edgar Hoover
 Michael Kenneth Williams as Rock Banyon, a 1950s jazz pianist-turned-private eye
 Kristen Wiig as Lauoreighiya Samcake (Jonrosh's ex-wife) who portrays Delores O’Dell
 Haley Joel Osment as Marty Comanche who portrays Alistair St. Barnaby-Bixby-Jones
 Michael Sheen as Christopher Smith who portrays Kenton Price
 Steve Tom as Chip Donwelly
 Marc Evan Jackson as Kermit Biggs
 Maya Rudolph as Fresno Foxglove
 Kate McKinnon as Dallas Boudreaux
 Tim Meadows as Gary Dunhill 
 Chris Parnell as Bebop Jones
 Emily Ratajkowski as Agent Day
 Bérénice Marlohe as Beatrice
 Andy Daly as Artie Mann
 Peter Coyote as Dizzy The Cat
 Chin Han as Salizar Vasquez Deleon
 Molly Shannon as Odessa Dobson who portrays Tricksy the bartender

Episodes

References

External links
Official website

The Spoils Before Dying at Rotten Tomatoes
The Spoils Before Dying at Metacritic

2010s American comedy television miniseries
English-language television shows
2015 American television series debuts
2015 American television series endings
Television series set in the 1950s
IFC (American TV channel) original programming
Television series by Funny or Die